Kammel Kalamak (Arabic: كمل كلامك, English: Keep Talking) is the 22nd album by Amr Diab, and the second with Rotana was released at the end of 2005.

Sales
The album has sold over 1,500,000 copies since its release.

Track listing
Credits adapted from CD booklet.

Personnel
Personnel as listed in the album's liner notes.
All Vocals By – Amr Diab
Artistic Vision By – Amr Diab, Tarek Madkour
Produced & Arranged By – Tarek Madkour, Adel Hakki, Fahd
Recorded, Mixed, Mastered By – Tarek Madkour, Mohamed Sakr
Cover, Design By – Khaled Roshdy

References

Amr Diab albums
2005 albums
Arabic-language albums